Güzelyayla is a town in Mersin Province, Turkey.

Geography 

Güzelyayla is a mountain town on the Taurus Mountains . The winter (settled) population was 2438 as of 2012.

History 
The earliest settlers were the members of a Turkmen tribe named Sarıkeçili in the 15th century. Two nearby settlements used by the tribe (Evci and Kızılbağ) later on were merged and they were declared the town of Güzelyayla in 1998.

Economy 
The main crops are apple, grape and especially peach. The traditional animal husbandry is another economic activity. Tourism at the moment plays only a minor role in the economy of the town. Being a mountain town (yayla) Güzelyayla attracts city dwellers for spending summer holidays.

References

Towns in Turkey
Yaylas in Turkey
Populated places in Toroslar District
Populated places in Mersin Province